Johnny Creek is one of many creeks running through the Temagami region of Northeastern Ontario, Canada. The creek is entirely within the municipality of Temagami, flowing in a west–east direction.

Course and hydrology

Johnny Creek is part of the Ottawa River drainage basin, a large area covering much of eastern Ontario and western Quebec where water drains into the Ottawa River. After Johnny Creek flows into Net Lake, the water drains through Net Creek, entering Cassels Lake. It then enters Rabbit Lake, which is drained by the Matabitchuan River. The Matabitchuan River then flows into Lake Timiskaming where the water eventually enters the Ottawa River.

Geology
The floodplain of Johnny Creek is in a low lying trend associated with the Link Lake Deformation Zone. Several small shear zones paralleling the Johnny Creek floodplain are probably related to the Link Lake Deformation Zone. A diorite dike, thought to have been associated with volcanic activity, is crosscut by these minor shear zones. This indicates that the dike intruded into the surrounding country rock at least prior to the latest reactivation of the Link Lake Deformation Zone. However, the amount of displacement along the deformation zone is unknown.

See also
List of rivers of Ontario

References

External links

Rivers of Temagami
Strathy Township